Enalapril/hydrochlorothiazide, sold under the brand name Vaseretic among others, is a fixed-dose combination medication used for the treatment of hypertension (high blood pressure). It contains enalapril, an angiotensin converting enzyme inhibitor, and hydrochlorothiazide a diuretic. It is taken by mouth.

The most frequent side effects include dizziness, headache, fatigue, and cough.

History 
Enalapril/hydrochlorothiazide was approved for medical use in the United States in October 1986.

References

Further reading

External links 
 
 

ACE inhibitors
Antihypertensive agents
Diuretics
Prodrugs